USS Suwannee (CVE-27), was built as the civilian oiler Markay, in 1939, before being acquired by the US Navy, in 1941, and renamed Suwannee (AO-33), after the tradition of naming fleet oilers after rivers. Originally classified as an "Aircraft Escort Vessel", AVG-27, on 14 February 1942, she was reclassified an "Auxiliary Aircraft Carrier", ACV-27, 20 August 1942, before finally being classified as an "Escort Carrier", CVE-27, 15 July 1943. After the war, she was later classified an "Escort Helicopter Aircraft Carrier" and again redesignated, CVHE-27, 12 June 1955.

Construction
Markay was laid down on 3 June 1938, at Kearney, New Jersey, by the Federal Shipbuilding & Dry Dock Co., under a Maritime Commission contract (MC Hull 5); launched on 4 March 1939; sponsored by Mrs. Marguerite Vickery (née Blanchard), wife of Howard L. Vickery; delivered to the Keystone Tankship Corporation, and operated by that company until acquired by the Navy, on 26 June 1941. Keystone Tankship Corp., in turn delivered the vessel at Baltimore, Maryland. Renamed Suwannee (AO-33), the ship was commissioned "in ordinary", an inactive status, on 9 July 1941, then placed in commission, on 16 July 1941.

World War II
On 20 August, she was redesignated an "Auxiliary Carrier", ACV-27, and was recommissioned as such on 24 September 1942, Captain Joseph J. Clark in command.

1942
Less than a month after commissioning, Suwannee was underway from Hampton Roads, for the invasion of North Africa. She joined  as the other carrier attached to the Center Attack Group whose specific objective was Casablanca, itself, via Fedhala, just to the north. Early in the morning of 8 November, she arrived off the coast of Morocco, and for the next few days, her Grumman F4F Wildcats maintained combat and anti-submarine (ASW) air patrols, while her Grumman TBF Avengers joined Rangers in bombing missions. During the Naval Battle of Casablanca from 8–11 November, Suwannee sent up 255 air sorties and lost only five planes, three in combat and two to operational problems.

On 11 November, off Fedhala Roads, her ASW patrol sank what was reported to be a German U-boat, but which was later determined to have been , one of the three French submarines which sortied from Casablanca, on the day of the assault. She was the first escort carrier to score against an enemy submarine, and she helped to prove the usefulness of her type in ASW.

Suwannee remained in North African waters until mid-November, then sailed, via Bermuda, for Norfolk, Virginia. She arrived back at Hampton Roads, on 24 November, and stayed until 5 December, when she got underway for the South Pacific.

1943
The auxiliary carrier transited the Panama Canal, on 11–12 December, and arrived at New Caledonia, on 4 January 1943. For the next seven months, she provided air escort for transports and supply ships replenishing and bolstering the Marines on Guadalcanal, as well as for the forces occupying other islands in the Solomons group. During that span of time, she visited Guadalcanal, Efate, and Espiritu Santo in addition to New Caledonia. She was reclassified as an "Escort Carrier", CVE-27, on 15 July 1943.

She returned to the United States at San Diego, California, in October, and by 5 November, was back at Espiritu Santo. On 13 November, she departed to participate in the Gilbert Islands operation. From 19–23 November, she was a part of the Air Support Group of the Southern Attack Force, and her planes bombed Tarawa, while the ships in the Northern Attack Force engaged the enemy at Makin. Following the occupation of the Gilberts, the escort carrier returned to the US, via Pearl Harbor, arriving in San Diego on 21 December.

1944
She remained on the west coast for two weeks, into the new year, then set a course for Lahaina Roads in the Hawaiian Islands. She departed Hawaii, on 22 January 1944, and headed for the Marshalls. During that operation, Suwannee joined the Northern Attack Force, and her planes bombed and strafed Roi and Namur Islands, in the northern part of Kwajalein Atoll, and conducted anti-submarine patrols for the task force. She remained in the vicinity of Kwajalein for the first 15 days of February, then spent the next nine days helping out at Eniwetok. On 24 February, she headed east again and arrived at Pearl Harbor, on 2 March for a two-week stay.

By 30 March, she was in the vicinity of the Palau Islands as the 5th Fleet subjected those islands to two days of extensive bombing raids. A week later, she put into Espiritu Santo, for four days. After short stops at Purvis Bay, in the Solomons, and at Seeadler Harbor, Manus, the escort carrier headed for New Guinea. For two weeks, she supported the Hollandia landings by shuttling replacement aircraft to the larger fleet carriers actually engaged in air support of the landings. She returned to Manus on 5 May.

Following two voyages from Espiritu Santo, one to Tulagi and the other to Kwajalein, Suwannee arrived off Saipan, in mid-June. For the next one and a half months, she supported the invasion of the Marianas, participating in the campaigns against Saipan and Guam. Suwanees planes did not actually become engaged in the famous battle of naval aircraft, because they remained with the invasion forces in the Marianas providing ASW and combat air patrols (CAPs).

On 4 August, she cleared the Marianas for Eniwetok and Seeadler Harbor, reaching the latter port on 13 August. Almost a month later, on 10 September, she put to sea to support the landings on Morotai in the Netherlands East Indies. Those landings went off without opposition on 15 September, and Suwannee returned to Seeadler Harbor, to prepare for the invasion of the Philippines.

On 12 October, the escort carrier got underway from Manus, in Rear Admiral Thomas L. Sprague's Escort Carrier Group to provide air support for the landings at Leyte Gulf. She reached the Philippines several days later, and her planes began strikes on enemy installations in the Visayas until 25 October. She provided air support for the assault forces with ASW and CAPs and strikes against Japanese installations ashore.

On 24–25 October 1944, the Japanese launched a major surface offensive from three directions to contest the landings at Leyte Gulf. While Admiral Jisaburo Ozawa's Mobile Force sailed south from Japan and drew the bulk of Admiral William Halsey's 3d Fleet off to the north, Admiral Shima's 2nd Striking Force, along with Admiral Shoji Nishimura's Force, attempted to force the Surigao Strait from the south. This drew Admiral Jesse B. Oldendorf's Bombardment Group south to meet that threat in the Battle of Surigao Strait. With Admiral Oldendorf's old battleships fighting in Surigao Strait and Halsey's 3rd Fleet scurrying north, Suwannee, with the other 15 escort carriers and 22 destroyers and destroyer escorts, formed the only Allied naval force operating off Leyte Gulf when Vice Admiral Takeo Kurita's 1st Striking Force sneaked through the unguarded San Bernardino Strait into the Philippine Sea.

Just before 07:00, on 25 October, one of s planes reported a Japanese force of four battleships, eight cruisers, and 11 destroyers. This force, Kurita's, immediately began a surface engagement with Rear Admiral Clifton Sprague's "Taffy 3", the northernmost group of escort carriers. Suwannee was much farther south as an element of Rear Admiral Thomas Sprague's "Taffy 1". Consequently, she did not participate in the running surface Battle off Samar.

Her problems came from another quarter. At 07:40, on 25 October, "Taffy 1" was jumped by land-based planes from Davao in the first deliberate kamikaze attack of the war. They hit the enemy, but he rolled over, dove at Suwannee and crashed into her at 08:04 about  forward of the after elevator, opening a  hole in her flight deck. His bomb compounded the fracture when it exploded between the flight and hangar decks, tearing a  gash in the latter and causing a number of casualties.

Medical officer Lieutenant Walter B. Burwell wrote:

One of our corpsmen tending the wounded on the flight deck saw the plight of those isolated by fire on the forecastle. He came below to report that medical help was critically needed there. It seemed to me that we would have to try to get through to them. So he and I restocked our first aid bags with morphine syrettes, tourniquets, sulfa, Vaseline, and bandages, commandeered a fire extinguisher and made our way forward, dodging flames along the main deck. Along part of the way, we were joined by a sailor manning a seawater fire hose with fairly good pressure, and though the seawater would only scatter the gasoline fires away from us, by using the water and foam alternatively as we advanced, we managed to work our way up several decks, through passageways along the wrecked and burning combat information center and decoding area, through officers' country, and finally out on the forecastle. Many of the crew on the forecastle and the catwalks above it had been blown over the side by the explosions. But others trapped below and aft of the forecastle area found themselves under a curtain of fire from aviation gasoline pouring down from burning planes on the flight deck above. Their only escape was to leap aflame into the sea, but some were trapped so that they were incinerated before they could leap. By the time we arrived on the forecastle, the flow of gasoline had mostly consumed itself, and flames were only erupting and flickering from combustible areas of water and oil. Nonetheless, the decks and bulkheads were still blistering hot and ammunition in the small arms locker on the deck below was popping from the heat like strings of firecrackers. With each salvo of popping, two or three more panicky crew men would leap over the side, and we found that our most urgent task was to persuade those poised on the rail not to jump by a combination of physical restraint and reassurance that fires were being controlled and that more help was on the way. Most of the remaining wounded in the forecastle area were severely burned beyond recognition and hope.

Within two hours, her flight deck was sufficiently repaired to enable the escort carrier to resume air operations. Suwanees group fought off two more air attacks before 13:00; then steamed in a northeasterly direction to join Taffy 3 and launch futile searches for Kurita's rapidly retiring force. Just after noon on 26 October, another group of kamikazes jumped Taffy 1. A Zero crashed into Suwanees flight deck at 1240 and careened into a torpedo bomber which had just been recovered. The two planes erupted upon contact as did nine other planes on her flight deck. The resulting fire burned for several hours, but was finally brought under control. The casualties for 25–26 October were 107 dead and 160 wounded. The escort carriers put into Kossol Roads, in the Palaus, on 28 October, then headed for Manus, for upkeep, on 1 November.

1945
After five days in Seeadler Harbor, Suwannee got underway to return to the west coast for major repairs. She stopped at Pearl Harbor, overnight on 19–20 November, and arrived at Puget Sound Navy Yard, on 26 November. Her repairs were completed by 31 January 1945; and, after brief stops at Hunter's Point and Alameda, California, she headed west and back into the war. The escort carrier stopped at Pearl Harbor, from 16–23 February, at Tulagi, from 4–14 March, and at Ulithi, from 21–27 March, before arriving off Okinawa, on 1 April.

Her first assignment was close air support for the invasion troops, but, within a few days, she settled down to a routine of pounding the kamikaze bases at Sakishima Gunto. For the major portion of the next 77 days, her planes continued to deny the enemy the use of those air bases. Periodically, she put into the anchorage at Kerama Retto, to rearm and replenish, but she spent the bulk of her time in air operations at sea.

On 16 June, she headed for San Pedro Bay, in Leyte Gulf. She remained there for a week, then returned to the Netherlands East Indies, at Makassar Strait, to support the landings at Balikpapan, Borneo. The carrier reentered San Pedro Bay, on 6 July, and spent the next month there. On 3 August, she got underway for Okinawa, arriving in Buckner Bay, three days later.

Hostilities ended on 15 August, but Suwannee remained at Okinawa, for the next three weeks. For the week that followed, the group operated off the coast of Kyushu, southwest of Nagasaki, Japan, while aircraft from the carriers patrolled the island and coast and assisted in locating mines in the clearance operations paving the way for entry into the harbor at Nagasaki. The ships had entered Nagasaki Harbor by 15 September while Allied prisoners of war (New Zealand) were taken on board the hospital ship . The carriers were sent there because of their medical facilities and doctors. Chenango left Nagasaki, on the morning of 15 September, with war prisoners. Crew members of Suwannee were given shore leave during their stay and observed the devastation of ground zero first hand. Suwannee and all the other ships in port experienced very difficult circumstances when typhoon Ida hit on 17 September. While moored between two buoys with two  steel cables and an  hawser both bow and stern, she lost all contact with the stern buoy and moved dangerously close to shore. The bow cables and hawser held and she remained safely in place by turning the screws to maintain position.

On 21 September, Suwannee departed Nagasaki, and remained at sea until she made a quick seven-hour stop at the outer harbor of Nagasaki before heading toward Kobe. That stop was aborted because of a minefield on the path there, so they returned south to Wakayama on 27 September. On 2 October, Suwannee Captain Charles C. McDonald and Rear Admiral William Sample, who headed COMCARDIV 22 on board Suwannee, took off in a Martin PBM Mariner to maintain their flight qualifications and never returned. They were declared dead on 4 October. They and the seven members of the flight crew were discovered in the wreckage of the aircraft on 19 November 1948, and their bodies were recovered.

During this time Suwannee was transferred from the US 9th Fleet to the 5th Fleet. They remained at Wakayama, until the morning of 4 October, and ran into  tropical storm Kate. They then spent a few days in the port of Kure, just south of Hiroshima, and then they returned near Wakayama, on 10 October, for "typhoon anchorage" as another storm, typhoon Louise, was approaching. They once again anchored in Wakayama, on 13 October, for about two days and then headed north to Tokyo, arriving on the evening of 18 October. About this time Suwannee received orders detaching them from the fleet and assigned them to Operation Magic Carpet.

The ship reached Saipan around 15:00, on 28 October, and stayed just long enough, 15 hours, to load stores and 400 troops. Then on to Guam, arriving at 17:00, on 29 October, to load approximately 35 planes, for a total complement of around 70 planes, then on to Pearl Harbor. For their November participation in Operation Magic Carpet they were part of a much larger contingency of ships. In the Pacific, all the 1,430,000 Navy, Coast Guard, and Marine personnel and the 1,360,000 Army people, on 1 November, except those in occupation units are scheduled to be returned by June. Engaged in the Pacific operations as of 10 November, were 489 ships having space for slightly under 700,000 passengers. Included were: 6 battleships, 7 large carriers, 4 Independence-class carriers, 45 escort carriers, 21 light cruisers, 164 troopships, 165 assault transports, 30 hospital transports, 7 converted Liberty ships and 40 miscellaneous craft.
 
After a stop in Hawaii, Suwannee was sent to Long Beach, and had a short dry-dock period. Then it was back to Operation Magic Carpet, on 4 December. This trip was to be a non-stop return to Okinawa, to pick up 1,500 troops on an overnight stop, and then return to Seattle. Because of bad weather they did not arrive in Okinawa until 21 December. In mid-January Suwannee unloaded many grateful troops in Los Angeles, and then headed north. After a few days off San Francisco, she headed for Pier 91, in Seattle, and then on to Bremerton. On 28 October, the carrier was placed in a reserve status with the 16th Fleet, at Boston, and just over two months later, on 8 January 1947, she was placed out of commission.

Suwannee remained in reserve at Boston, for the next 12 years. She was designated an "Escort Helicopter Aircraft Carrier", CVHE-27, on 12 June 1955, while in reserve. Her name was struck from the Navy List on 1 March 1959. Her hulk was sold to the Isbrantsen Steamship Company, of New York City, on 30 November 1959, for conversion to merchant service. The project was subsequently canceled and in May 1961, her hulk was resold to the J.C. Berkwit Company, also of New York City. She was finally scrapped in Bilbao, Spain, in June 1962.

Awards
Suwannee earned 13 battle stars during World War II.

References

Bibliography

Further reading

External links
 navsource.org: USS Suwannee
 hazegray.org: USS Suwannee
 Account of kamikaze attack by Lieutenant Walter B. Burwell
 U.S.S. Suwannee (CVE-27) Home Page

Type T3-S2-A tankers
Ships built in Kearny, New Jersey
1939 ships
Merchant ships of the United States
Cimarron-class oilers (1939)
World War II auxiliary ships of the United States
World War II tankers of the United States
Sangamon-class escort carriers
World War II escort aircraft carriers of the United States